Roman Rock Lighthouse is a lighthouse in False Bay, near Simon's Town. It is the only lighthouse in South Africa built on a single rock.

The light was first exhibited on 16 September 1861.

The light was electrified in 1992 at the request of the South African Navy.

See also

List of lighthouses in South Africa

References

External links

Lighthouses in South Africa
Lighthouses completed in 1861
1861 establishments in the Cape Colony
Articles containing video clips